Night of the Sharks is a 1988 Italian-Spanish-Mexican film directed and co-written by Tonino Ricci. The film's story takes place in Miami, Florida and Cancún, Mexico, although it was filmed in the Dominican Republic.

Plot
James Ziegler has spent five years of his life planning the perfect crime, bugging the communication devices of Rosentski, an influential and rich businessman. His dream finally comes through when he records a sensitive conversation between Rosentski and the President of the United States; so sensitive that he demands $2 million in diamonds from Rosentski for a disc of the recording. Rosentski decides to pay Ziegler for the disc but instead sends his enforcer to retrieve it. The enforcer tries to kill Ziegler but fails and Ziegler successfully escapes with the disc and the diamonds.

Ziegler goes to hide out with his brother David, who lives as a beach bum and shark hunter on the coast outside of Cancún. David lives with his friend and business partner Paco and has a seagoing neighbor, a man-eating shark named Cyclops. James Ziegler crash lands in a seaplane near David's shack. The plane explodes, while James survives just long enough to hand over the disc and the diamonds to David.

Rosentski is displeased with his enforcer's jumping the gun. He correctly surmises that James had gone to hide with his brother David and arranges a meeting with David's ex-wife, Liz. Rosentski promises he will pay off Liz's considerable business debts as well as reward her if she recovers the disc and diamonds. Rosentski's enforcer, however, wants the diamonds for himself and leads an assassination squad against David. David abhors firearms but has no objections to fighting back using bladed weapons, booby traps, molotov cocktails and his shark, Cyclops.

Cast
 Treat Williams as David Ziegler 
 Antonio Fargas as Paco  
 Carlo Mucari as James Ziegler 
 Janet Agren as Liz Ziegler 
 John Steiner as Rosentski  
 Stelio Candelli as Rosentski's Enforcer   
 Nina Soldano as Juanita  
 Salvatore Borghese as Garcia  
 Christopher Connelly as Father Mattia

Production
Filming took place in the Dominican Republic.

External links
 
 Night of the Sharks at Rotten Tomatoes

1988 films
1988 action films
Italian action films
Mexican action films
Spanish action films
Films about sharks
Films about shark attacks
Films shot in the Dominican Republic
Films directed by Tonino Ricci
Films produced by Fulvio Lucisano
Films scored by Stelvio Cipriani
1980s Italian films
1980s Mexican films